La Cumplida Airport  is an airport serving the village of La Cumplida in Matagalpa Department, Nicaragua.

The airport is in a basin with rising terrain in all quadrants, and a nearby mountain ridge to the west. The lowest terrain is to the east of the runway.

See also

 List of airports in Nicaragua
 Transport in Nicaragua

References

External links
OpenStreetMap - La Cumplida Airport
 HERE Maps - La Cumplida

Airports in Nicaragua
Matagalpa Department